8:15 12:15 is the ninth comedy album by Bill Cosby. It was his first double-disc album. It was also his first record not released strictly by Warner Bros. Records label but by Tetragrammaton Records (which was co-owned by Cosby at the time) instead.

Background
This album was recorded live at Harrah's Lake Tahoe, Nevada. As implied by the title, the album is made of recordings from two shows. The 8:15 show was more family-oriented material and the 12:15 contained more adult humor. Unlike Cosby's Warner Bros. LPs, the album is not divided into bits but instead purports to be complete recordings of the two shows.

Much of the record contains material already previously recorded on earlier albums and, indeed, some material performed on the first disc is also performed on the second disc.  There are several instances of Cosby interacting with the audience, and at one point he introduces Carroll Shelby, creator of the custom-made Shelby Cobra from 200 M.P.H.

This album was recorded not long before production began on The Bill Cosby Show, and on Side One Bill talks briefly about the upcoming series.

There are two versions of the album, one containing a few lines near the end of the 12:15 disc pertaining to his wife's pregnancy and alludes to a failed diaphragm, referring to it as "the midnight  (trampoline)". This last portion of the routine is edited out in some copies of the LP.

The shows on this record were recorded a few hours after Joe Namath's New York Jets' guaranteed win over the Baltimore Colts in Super Bowl III. On side one, Bill asks how the football game was that day, and makes mention of "a lot of Baltimore people out there just eating".

Track listing

8:15
Side One
"Opening" – 17:35
Side Two
"Main Dinner Show" – 14:00

12:15
Side Three
"Opening" – 19:30
Side Four
"Main Second Show" – 20:15

References

1960s comedy albums
1969 live albums
Bill Cosby live albums
Stand-up comedy albums
Live spoken word albums
Spoken word albums by American artists
Tetragrammaton Records live albums
1960s spoken word albums